Middle Stoke Halt (TQ 833 753  ) was a halt on the Hundred of Hoo Railway. It was opened in July 1906 and closed to passengers on 4 December 1961.

References

Sources.

External links
 Subterranea Britannica
 Middle Stoke Halt station on navigable 1940 O. S. map

Disused railway stations in Kent
Former South Eastern Railway (UK) stations
Railway stations in Great Britain opened in 1906
Railway stations in Great Britain closed in 1961
Transport in Medway